Dudleya edulis is a species of perennial succulent plant known by the common names fingertips, lady fingers, mission lettuce and the San Diego dudleya. The common name denotes the finger-like shape of the leaves, while the specific epithet edulis refers to the use of the young scapes as food by the Kumeyaay. It is native to Southern California and northern Baja California, and grows on rocky hillsides, cliffs, and bare rock.

Description 
Dudleya edulis is made up of an array of fleshy, finger-like leaves growing vertically from a caudex at or just below ground level. The flowers have pointed white to cream petals about a centimeter long. The bloom period is May to July. The plant is diploid, with a chromosome number of n=17, which is the base number for Dudleya.

Taxonomy

Taxonomic history 
Thomas Nuttall discovered the species during his visit to California in the 1830s. He found it on the edges of "rocks and ravines, St. Diego" and named it Sedum edule, with edule (meaning "edible") probably referring to the use of the scapes of the plant as food by the indigenous peoples. Despite placing it in the genus Sedum, he noted that it was "a remarkable species apparently allied to Ech­everia teretifolia." It is unknown why Nuttall chose to place the plant in Sedum, as he had described the other Dudleya of the region as Echeveria, but it is speculated that he placed it as a Sedum because of the spreading petals on the flowers.

During their work revising the North American Crassulaceae, taxonomists Nathaniel Lord Britton and Joseph Nelson Rose placed the plant in the new genus Stylophyllum, which was differentiated from their new genus Dudleya on the basis of round leaves and spreading petals. With Reid Moran's revision of Dudleya, the plants within Stylophyllum were moved, as Stylophyllum was merged into a subgenera of Dudleya.

Willis L. Jepson once regarded the nearby Dudleya attenuata as a subspecies of this plant, owing to their similar morphology, although they are very distinct. They can be distinguished by the fact that D. attenuata is a smaller plant, with slender and elongated stems, and fewer smaller leaves that are glaucous and clavate to some degree. The leaf bases are also higher, and the inflorescence is simpler with more remote flowers.

It is known to naturally hybridize with Dudleya stolonifera, D. attenuata, D. brevifolia, D. formosa and D. blochmaniae where their ranges overlap. Most of these hybrids are uncommon, and the plants hybridizing with stolonifera may be backcrosses.

Distribution and habitat
The plant is endemic to chaparral habitats, and is native to southwestern Southern California and slightly into northwestern Baja California. It is found north from coastal Orange County and southern Riverside County, south throughout San Diego County into the Rio San Vicente drainage of Baja California, a habitat that spans over 190 miles (305 km), from the Pacific coast east towards the southwest flank of Cuyamaca Peak, around 40 miles inland and up to elevations of 1,300 meters. In its southern distribution, the plant can be found more on north-facing slopes and cliffs.

It grows in rocky slopes and soil, and on rock outcrops and ledges, from sea level to below  in elevation. It is found in coastal sage scrub and chaparral and woodlands habitats.

Cultivation
Dudleya edulis is cultivated as an ornamental plant, planted in native plant and wildlife gardens, drought tolerant rock gardens, and as specimens in pots.<ref>[http://www.laspilitas.com/nature-of-california/plants/254--dudleya-edulis Las Pilitas Nursery Horticulture Database: Dudleya edulis (Fingertips, Lady Fingers, San Diego Dudleya)]</ref> Thomas Nuttall noted the use of the plant as a food source by the indigenous occupants of the land, which gives the plant its specific epithet. The native peoples would harvest the young tender leaves in spring, and eat them raw. The Tiipai members of the Kumeyaay had a specific name for the narrow-leaved Dudleya like this plant, calling them milh kajmila''.

References

External links
Calflora Database:  Dudleya edulis (Fingertips)
Jepson Manual eFlora (TJM2) treatment of Dudleya edulis
UC CalPhotos gallery of Dudleya edulis
USDA Plants Profile for Dudleya edulis (fingertips)  

edulis
Flora of California
Flora of Baja California
Natural history of the California chaparral and woodlands
Natural history of the Peninsular Ranges
Natural history of San Diego County, California
~
~
Taxa named by Reid Venable Moran
Garden plants of North America
Drought-tolerant plants
Taxa named by Thomas Nuttall
Flora without expected TNC conservation status